Day of Fire is the eponymous debut studio album by American rock band Day of Fire. The album's songs, which were written by lead vocalist Joshua Brown and lead guitarist Gregg Hionis, deal with human weakness. "Reap and Sow" was featured on the Digital Praise PC game Guitar Praise.

Track listing

Awards

On 2005, the album won a Dove Award for Rock Album of the Year at the 36th GMA Dove Awards. The song "Cornerstone" was also nominated for Rock Recorded Song of the Year.

Personnel
Josh Brown - vocals
Gary Novak - drums
Chris Chaney - bass
Phil X - guitar
Gregg Hionis - guitar
JJ Farris, Matthew Nelson - additional vocals
Robin Olsen - strings
Fontaine Weyman - additional vocals

References

2004 debut albums
Day of Fire albums
Essential Records (Christian) albums
Albums produced by Scott Humphrey